Mindan (Hanja: 民團), or the Korean Residents Union in Japan, is one of two main organizations for Koreans living in Japan, the other being Chongryon. Mindan has ties to South Korea and was established in 1946 in Tokyo, Japan. Currently, among the 610,000 Korean residents in Japan who have not become naturalized Japanese citizens, 65% are members of Mindan, and another 25% are members of Chongryon.

Mindan members prefer the modern South Korean term  to be used when discussing Korea. Chongryon members, some of whom are North Korean fellow travellers, prefer the older term . Because Chōsen was the term used during the Japanese rule of Korea and North Korea does not recognize Kankoku, this causes enmity between the groups.

History
The Korean War (1950–1953) brought about a sharp division between members of Chongryon and Mindan, with each organization strongly supporting the North or South respectively. Mindan members went to Korea as volunteer soldiers in the conflict.

As the term kyoryū, meaning "resident", became a politically sensitive term, the organization adopted its present name in 1994 by simply dropping the term kyoryū. Despite the formal renaming of the organization, it has been consistently known as Kankoku Mindan or simply Mindan in Japan.

Activities
Main activities include campaigning for ahead of foreign investment regime in Japan, supporting newcomer Koreans to obtain special permanent resident, campaigning against the foreign registration order/law, and campaigning for the elimination of legal and economic disparity with Japanese.

Mindan provided food supplies for the victims of the 2011 Tōhoku earthquake and tsunami.

Affiliates
Republic of Korea Woman Association in Japan
Zainichi Korean Apprentice Volunteers' Comerade Association
Korean Sport Association in Japan
Korean Chamber of Commerce & Industry in Japan
Korean Youth Association in Japan
Republic of Korea Student Association in Japan
Korean Scientist Association in Japan
Korean Lawyer Forum in Japan
United Korean Credit Association in Japan
Korean Culture and Art Association in Japan
Korean Doctor Association in Japan
Korean School League in Japan
Mindan Life Introducing Center
Mindan North Korean Defector Support Center
Zainichi Korean History Museum
Korean schools (Kankoku gakkō)
Educational Foundation Baekdu Hagwon
Keonguk Kindergarten
Keonguk Elementary School
Keonguk Primary School
Keonguk High School
Osaka Kongo International Elementary, Middle & High School
Tokyo Korean School
Kyoto International Junior and Senior High School

See also

Japan-Korea relations
Ethnic issues in Japan
Koreatowns in Japan
Korean diaspora (a.k.a. 'Dongpo' or 'Gyopo')
Chongryon, similar organization with close ties to North Korea

References

External links
MINDAN official website (Korean, Japanese)
History of Mindan (English)
Mindan News (Japanese)
Republic of Korea (ROK) Embassy in Japan (Korean / Japanese)

Mindan
Anti-racist organizations
Diaspora organizations
Ethnic organizations based in Japan
Korean diaspora in Asia
Zainichi Korean culture
Japan–South Korea relations
Organizations established in 1946